Shui Qingxia (born 18 December 1966 in Funing) is a female Chinese association football player who competed in the 1996 Summer Olympics and in the 2000 Summer Olympics.

In 1996 she won the silver medal with the Chinese team. She played all five matches.

Four years later she was a squad member of the Chinese team which finished fifth in the women's tournament, but she did not see any action.

International goals

External links

profile

1966 births
Living people
Chinese women's footballers
Olympic footballers of China
Footballers at the 1996 Summer Olympics
Footballers at the 2000 Summer Olympics
Olympic silver medalists for China
Olympic medalists in football
1991 FIFA Women's World Cup players
1995 FIFA Women's World Cup players
Asian Games medalists in football
Footballers at the 1994 Asian Games
Footballers at the 1998 Asian Games
Medalists at the 1996 Summer Olympics
China women's international footballers
Asian Games gold medalists for China
Women's association footballers not categorized by position
Medalists at the 1994 Asian Games
Medalists at the 1998 Asian Games